Robert Norgate (18 June 1920 – 24 September 1956) was a Canadian sculptor. His work was part of the sculpture event in the art competition at the 1948 Summer Olympics.

References

1920 births
1956 deaths
20th-century Canadian sculptors
Canadian male sculptors
20th-century Canadian male artists
Olympic competitors in art competitions
Artists from Toronto